Claudia McNeil (August 13, 1917 – November 25, 1993) was an American actress known for premiering the role of matriarch Lena Younger in both the stage and screen productions of A Raisin in the Sun.

She later appeared in a 1981 production of the musical version of the play, Raisin presented by Equity Library Theater. She was twice nominated for a Tony Award, first for her onstage performance in A Raisin in the Sun (1959), and again for the play Tiger Tiger Burning Bright in 1962. She was also nominated for a Golden Globe Award and a BAFTA Award for the screen version of A Raisin in the Sun in 1961.

Life and career
McNeil was born in Baltimore, Maryland, to Marvin Spencer McNeil, who was black, and Annie Mae (Anderson) McNeil, an Apache woman. The family moved to New York City soon after her birth. She was raised by her mother after her father left the family. At the age of 12, McNeil began working for The Heckscher Foundation for Children. There she met a Jewish couple who later adopted her, and McNeil became fluent in Yiddish.

She became a licensed librarian, but soon began singing in vaudeville theaters, and performing in nightclubs in Harlem, Greenwich Village and on 52nd Street. McNeil also sang for the Katherine Dunham Dance Troupe on its South American tour.

She was advised by Ethel Waters to begin acting, and made her New York stage debut in 1953, understudying Jacqueline Andre in the role of Tituba in The Crucible at the Martin Beck Theater. She first went on in the role in mid-March 1953. 
Four years later, Langston Hughes chose her to sing in his musical play Simply Heavenly.  She won critical acclaim for this role.

In 1961, McNeil recreated her 1959 stage role in the film A Raisin in the Sun and became so identified with the part of the matriarch that she said, “There was a time when I acted the role.…Now I live it.” New York Times journalist Eric Pace summarized McNeil's performance explaining that she had a "commanding presence." Pace continued, "On the screen, Miss McNeil was stolid, voluminous and serene as a mother trying to control her son (played by Sidney Poitier) and wanting to buy her family a respectable home."

She acted in more films, including The Last Angry Man (1959), There Was a Crooked Man... (1970), and Black Girl (1972).

She also starred in the plays Tiger Tiger Burning Bright (1962), James Baldwin's The Amen Corner (1965), Something Different (1967), Her First Roman (1968), Wrong Way Light-Bulb (1969) and Contributions (1970). In 1980, she and Sam Levene starred in a summer stock and national tour of Henry Denker's comedy, Horowitz & Mrs. Washington .

McNeil appeared in many TV series, including The DuPont Show of the Month (1957), The Nurses (1962), Profiles in Courage (1965), and Roots: The Next Generations (1979).

By the time she appeared in the 1959 film The Last Angry Man, she weighed nearly 300 pounds. In 1978, when she sang at Michael's Pub in Manhattan, she had slimmed down to 159 pounds and commented, "I lost a whole person."

Personal life
McNeil was married when she was 19 to a husband whom she described as a "very wonderful man", whose name she wouldn't disclose. They had two sons. Her husband died in World War II. Both her sons were reportedly killed in the Korean War.  
Her second marriage (to Herman McCoy) ended in divorce after two years in 1964. 

She studied Judaism, the religion of her adoptive parents, in youth. Though she maintained a great respect for it, even saying she carried a copy of both the Talmud and the Bible with her wherever she went, she converted to Catholicism in 1952 and was said to have been a devout.

Retirement and death

She retired in 1983 and two years later moved into the Actors’ Fund Nursing Home in Englewood, New Jersey. McNeil died there on November 25, 1993, aged 76, from complications related to diabetes.

Selected filmography

Film
 The Last Angry Man (1959) - Mrs. Quincy
 A Raisin in the Sun (1961) - Lena Younger
 There Was a Crooked Man... (1970) - Madam
 Black Girl (1972) - Mu' Dear

Television
 The DuPont Show of the Month (1957) - Bernice Sadie Brown
 The Nurses (1963) - Mrs. Hill
 Profiles in Courage (1965) - Mrs. Haines
 Moon of the Wolf (1972) - Sara
 Cry Panic (1974) - Ethel Hanson
 Roots: The Next Generations (1979) - Sister Will Ada

References

External links

 ISU Play Concordances
New York Times obituary
The African American Registry

1917 births
1993 deaths
20th-century American actresses
Actresses from Maryland
Actresses from New Jersey
Actresses from New York City
African-American Catholics
20th-century African-American women singers
African-American librarians
American adoptees
American people of Apache descent
Burials at Kensico Cemetery
Deaths from diabetes
Musicians from Baltimore
Native American actresses
Native American Roman Catholics
Native American singers
People from Englewood, New Jersey
Singers from New York City
Torch singers
Vaudeville performers
Yiddish-speaking people
American television actresses
African-American actresses
American film actresses
American musical theatre actresses
American stage actresses
American librarians
American women librarians
20th-century American singers
Converts to Roman Catholicism from Judaism
Singers from Maryland
20th-century American women singers
Catholics from New Jersey